The following is a list of winners of the Golden Calf for best Long Documentary at the NFF.

 2022 Shamira Raphaëla - Shabu
 2021 Els van Driel and Eefje Blankevoort - Shadow Game
 2020 Sandra Beerends - Ze noemen me Baboe
 2019 Claire Pijman - Living the Light - Robby Müller
 2018 Aliona van der Horst - Liefde is aardappelen
 2017 Petra Lataster-Czisch & Peter Lataster - De kinderen van juf Kiet
 2016 Tom Fassaert - A Family Affair
 2015 Morgan Knibbe - Those Who Feel the Fire Burning
 2014 Niels van Koevorden & Sabine Lubbe Bakker - Ne me quitte pas
 2013 Diego Gutierrez - Parts of a Family
 2012 Marc Schmidt - De regels van Matthijs
 2011 Petra Lataster-Czisch & Peter Lataster - Niet zonder jou
 2010 Ditteke Mensink - Farewell
 2009 Jan Musch & Tijs Tinbergen - Rotvos
 2008 Coco Schrijber - Bloody Mondays & Strawberry Pies
 2007 Jeroen Berkvens - Jimmy Rosenberg - de vader, de zoon & het talent
 2006 Heddy Honigmann - Forever
 2005 Rogier Kappers - Lomax the Songhunter
 2004 Jan van den Berg - Deacon of Death
 2003 Pieter-Rim de Kroon en Maarten de Kroon - Hollands Licht
 2002 Pieter Fleury - Ramses
 2001 Maria Ramos - Desi
 2000 Heddy Honigmann - Crazy
 1999 Chris Vos & André van der Hout - De illusie aan de macht - 1412 dagen kabinet Den Uyl
 1998 Fatima Jebli Ouazzani - In My Father's House
 1997 René Roelofs - Kerstmis in Floradorp
 1996 Niek Koppen - De slag in de Javazee
 1995 Vincent Monnikendam - Moeder Dao, de schildpadgelijkende
 1994 Peter en Petra Lataster - Verhalen van een rivier
 1993 Willy Lindwer - Kind in twee werelden
 1992 Froukje Bos - Levenslied
 1991 Johan van der Keuken - Face Value
 1990 Joost Kraanen - Lust for Gold
 1989 Albert van der Wildt - Beeld van een kind
 1988 Cherry Duyns - De wording
 1987 Rien Hagen - New York - Batavia
 1986 Olivier Koning - Passies
 1985 Harrie Geelen - Getekende mensen
 1984 Olivier Koning - Terbeschikkinggesteld
 1983 Gerrit van Elst - De kick
 1982 Rudolf van den Berg - Sal Santen rebel

References

External links
 NFF Website

Best Long Documentary
Documentary film awards